Oluwole is a common Nigerian given name of Yoruba origin.

Notable people with the name include:

As a name

 Christopher Oluwole Rotimi  Nigerian Army Brigadier General
 Oluwole Akinyele Agbede Nigerian professor
 Oluwole Olayiwola Amusan Nigerian academic
 Oluwole Soyinka Nigerian playwright
 Oluwole Babafemi Familoni Nigerian Academic
 Oluwole Olumuyiwa Nigerian architect
 Winston Oluwole Soboyejo American scientist
 Christopher Oluwole Rotimi retired Nigerian Army Brigadier General
 Timothy Oluwole Obadare Nigerian televangelist
 Oluwatosin Oluwole Ajibade Nigerian singer
 Festus Oluwole Segun Nigerian clergy
 Stephen Oluwole Awokoya former minister of education in Nieria

As a surname

 Isaac Ladipo Oluwole Nigerian medical practitioner
 Oba Oluwole former Oba of Lagos
 Isaac Oluwole  Nigerian bishop
 Sophie Oluwole Nigerian philosopher

Yoruba given names
Yoruba-language surnames